Mañana Será Bonito (Spanish for Tomorrow Will Be Pretty) is the fourth studio album by Colombian singer Karol G. It was released on February 24, 2023, through Universal Music Latino. Comprising seventeen tracks, the album is primarily a reggaeton record and features guest appearances by Romeo Santos, Quevedo, Shakira, Justin Quiles, Ángel Dior, Maldy, Bad Gyal, Sean Paul, Sech, Ovy on the Drums, and Carla Morrison.

Mañana Será Bonito was supported by six singles: "Provenza", "Gatúbela" with Maldy, "Cairo" with Ovy on the Drums, "X Si Volvemos" with Romeo Santos, "TQG" with Shakira, which became Karol G's first number-one single on the Billboard Global 200 and top-ten single on the US Billboard Hot 100, and "Mientras Me Curo del Cora". The album was a critical and commercial success and became the first all-Spanish language album by a woman to reach number one on the US Billboard 200, earning 94,000 album-equivalent units in its first week.

Background 
Following the release of her third studio album in 2021, KG0516, Karol G began releasing collaborative songs with other artists and stand alone singles, such as Tiësto's "Don't Be Shy", her own "Sejodioto" and Becky G's "Mamiii", among others.

On April 19, 2022, Karol G announced the release of "Provenza" through her social media accounts. The song was released on April 21, 2022 as the album's lead single. On September 6, 2022 Karol G embarked on the Strip Love Tour. "Gatúbela", a collaboration with Maldy was released on August 25, 2022 as the following single. On November 13, 2022, "Cairo" with long-time producer Ovy on the Drums was released. On January 25, 2023, Giraldo announced and revealed the title for the album, Mañana Será Bonito, in a video shared through her social media accounts. "X Si Volvemos" with Romeo Santos was released on February 2, 2023.

On February 10, 2023, Giraldo revealed the cover art for the album and revealed the track list, featuring guest appearances from Quevedo, Justin Quiles, Ángel Dior, Bad Gyal, Sean Paul, Sech and Carla Morrison. On February 14, Karol G revealed to The New York Times that Colombian singer Shakira was featured on track 6, "TQG". The song was released as the fifth single alongside the album's release. Mañana Será Bonito was officially released on February 24, 2023.

Concept 

In an interview with Rolling Stone, Karol G revealed the concept for the title, stating: "This definitely represents a specific phase of my life. The name of album is a phrase I kept repeating to myself when nothing felt great. I mean, I was going through the best moment of my career, but personally I was really disconnected from myself and from my friends. I wasn't unhappy, but I wasn't happy either. So every day I'd say to myself, 'It's okay, mañana será bonito, tomorrow will be beautiful.'"

In a later interview with The New York Times, she described the album as "more Carolina than Karol G". She added: "Right now, I notice that artists are trying very hard to find a concept, to be very experimental, I love that. And that's a good way to do art. But the concept of this album is just me being me. I really didn't want people to feel it was like very simple, or just normal."

Release and promotion
The album was released on February 24, 2023 through Universal Music Latino. It was released on CD, digital download and streaming. Lead single "Provenza" was promoted at Coachella Valley Music and Arts Festival as well as at the Latin Grammys, including a mash-up with "Gatúbela" and "Cairo", with the later one being its debut performance. The first two previously mentioned were also promoted on Giraldo's Strip Love Tour.

Singles
"Provenza" was released on April 21, 2021 as the album's lead single. The song was serviced to contemporary rhythmic radio in the United States on June 7, 2022.  The song was a commercial success, becoming the highest peaking full-Spanish song by a female soloist on the US Billboard Hot 100 chart at number 25. The song also reached the top spot US Billboard Hot Latin Songs. It was nominated for Record of the Year and Song of the Year at the 23rd Annual Latin Grammy Awards.

"Gatúbela" with Puerto Rican rapper Maldy was released on August 25, 2022 as the album's second single. The song was described as "an infectious old-school reggaeton laced with intense perreo beats". It reached the top 40 of the US Billboard Hot 100 chart, at number 37. It also peaked inside the top 5 at number 4 on the US Billboard Hot Latin Songs.

"Cairo" with long-time producer Ovy on the Drums was released on November 13, 2022 as the third single from the album. The song peaked inside the top 15 of the US Billboard Hot Latin Songs. It was awarded triple platinum certification in the United States.

"X Si Volvemos" with American singer Romeo Santos was released on February 2, 2023 as the fourth single from the album. It reached the top 60 of the US Billboard Hot 100 chart, at number 56. It also peaked at number 5 on the US Billboard Hot Latin Songs.

"TQG with Colombian singer Shakira was released alongside the album's release on February 24, 2023. It became Karol G and Shakira's first number-one single on the Billboard Global 200. It also debuted at number seven on the US Billboard Hot 100, becoming Karol G's first top-ten single and Shakira's sixth.

Critical reception

Giraldo's ability to connect with the listener was praised multiple times. Rolling Stone stated, “Karol's voice is open and warm, blessed with a laid-back purity that is rare in the raucous urbano field. [Like] any global diva worth her salt, Karol engineers the fickle illusion that she’s addressing you, the listener, directly — whether evoking unfulfilled desire for a past lover or compiling a list of future erotic delights." The Guardian followed with "The lyrics are generally of boozy lust and thwarted longing, [but] Karol's skill is in evocative melodies that transcend any language barrier."

Production from Ovy on the Drums was also applauded on the Rolling Stone review, calling him a “digital architect able to inject a sense of purpose into the most tired reggaeton back beat. [It's] nimble and cool, kinetic and futuristic.”

Comercial performance
During the first day of release on Spotify, Mañana Será Bonito opened with 32 million streams on the Spotify Global chart and 35.7 million overall, breaking the record for the biggest debut for a Spanish-language album by a woman, previously held by Rosalía's Motomami.

United States
Mañana Será Bonito debuted at number one on the US Billboard 200 chart, earning 94,000 album-equivalent units in its opening week, of which 10,000 came from pure sales, becoming Giraldo's first number one as well as her first top ten album on the chart. Mañana Será Bonitos tracks collected a total of 118.73 million on-demand audio streams in its first week, representing the largest US streaming week ever for a Latin album by a woman. It became the first all-Spanish-language album by a woman to reach the top spot, and third overall after Bad Bunny's El Último Tour Del Mundo and Un Verano Sin Ti. It also surpassed Shakira's Fijación Oral, Vol. 1 as the all-time highest charting Spanish-language album on the Billboard 200 chart by a female artist. The album also debuted atop the US Top Latin Albums chart, becoming Giraldo's second number one album on the chart, after KG0516.

Track listing 

Notes
  signifies a co-producer
  signifies an additional producer

Personnel
 Karol G – vocals
 Dave Kutch – mastering
 Rob Kinelski – mixing
 Eli Heisler – mixing assistance
 Juan Andres Ospina – chorus, engineering, vocal arrangement (track 1)
 Ovy on the Drums – engineering (1), vocals (16)
 Linda Goldstein – vocal arrangement (1)
 Romeo Santos – vocals (2)
 Quevedo – vocals (3)
 Shakira – vocals (6)
 Justin Quiles – vocals (8)
 Ángel Dior – vocals (8)
 Maldy – vocals (10)
 Bad Gyal – vocals (11)
 Sean Paul – vocals (11)
 Sech – vocals (14)
 Carla Morrison – vocals (17)

Charts

Release history

See also 
 List of Billboard 200 number-one albums of 2023

References 

2023 albums
Karol G albums
Spanish-language albums
Universal Music Latino albums
Albums produced by Ovy on the Drums